The 1996–97 Kentucky Wildcats men's basketball team represented University of Kentucky in the 1996–97 NCAA Division I men's basketball season. They were coached by Rick Pitino in his eighth, and final, season at Kentucky as members of the East division of the Southeast Conference. They played their home games at Rupp Arena in Lexington, Kentucky. They finished the season 35–5, 13–3 in SEC play to finish in second place in the East division. They defeated Auburn, Mississippi, and Georgia to win the SEC tournament. As a result, they received the conference's automatic bid to the NCAA tournament as the No. 1 seed in the West region. They defeated Montana, Iowa, Saint Joseph's and Utah to return to the Final Four for the second consecutive year. In the Final Four, they defeated Minnesota to advance to the National Championship game against Arizona. Looking to repeat as NCAA champions, the Wildcats lost in overtime to Arizona 84–79.

Following the season, head coach Rick Pitino left the school to take the head coaching job for the Boston Celtics.

Previous season 
The Wildcats finished the 1995–96 season 34–2, 16–0 in SEC play to win the SEC regular season championship. They defeated Florida and Arkansas in the SEC tournament before losing to Mississippi State in the championship game. They received an at-large bid to the NCAA tournament as the No. 1 seed in the Midwest region. There they defeated San Jose State, Virginia Tech, Utah, and Wake Forest to earn a trip to the Final Four. In the Final Four, they defeated UMass in the National semifinal game and Syracuse in the championship game to win the tournament championship.

Roster

Schedule

|-
!colspan=11 style=| Exhibition

|-
!colspan=12 style=|Regular season

|-
!colspan=9 style=|SEC Tournament

|-
!colspan=9 style=|NCAA tournament

Rankings

Awards and honors

Team players drafted into the NBA

References

Kentucky
Kentucky Wildcats men's basketball seasons
NCAA Division I men's basketball tournament Final Four seasons
Kentucky
Wild
Wild